Santa Nella is an unincorporated village and census-designated place (CDP) in Merced County, California, United States. As of the 2020 census, Santa Nella had a population of 2,211, up from 1,380 at the 2010 census.

The site's status as a stopping place for travelers dates back to the 19th century when it was Rancho de Centinela (Spanish for "Sentinel Ranch") along El Camino Viejo; the route through the community has since been replaced by Interstate 5 and State Route 33.

Etymology
The name does not refer to a saint, as there is no saint named "Nella". The name is an English language corruption of the Spanish word centinela ("sentinel"), referring to the earlier Centinela Adobe that was located in the vicinity.

History

Santa Nella began as the site of Rancho de Centinela (Sentinel Ranch) first established by pioneering stockmen from San Juan Bautista and Monterey as a place to raise horses in 1810. The escape of many of the horses into the valley and subsequent Indian hostilities made the enterprise a failure.

The land and adobe of this old Spanish ranch was included in the Rancho San Luis Gonzaga in 1843. From the time of the California Gold Rush the stage road from Hill's Ferry crossed San Luis Creek at Centinella on the way to connect with the Pacheco Pass road at Rancho San Luis. The old Centinela ranch became a stopping place for stages and travelers on El Camino Viejo. Later a two-story adobe house was constructed near the old adobe by Basque sheepmen in the 1860s and a wooden barn in the 1870s. The two-story adobe was subsequently torn down in the 1890s and replaced by a frame house built by Miller and Lux. This house and barn were for a long time local landmarks. However, by 1966, the wooden house and barn had been removed and a roadside stop built on the site along State Route 33. The name of the place had been corrupted into Santa Nella.

The community was entered into the Geographic Names Information System in 1981 as "Santa Nella Village". In 2010, it became a census-designated place under the "Santa Nella" name.

Geography
Santa Nella is in western Merced County, on the western edge of California's Central Valley. Interstate 5 passes through the north side of the community, with access from Exit 407 (California State Route 33). I-5 leads north  to Stockton and southeast  to the Bakersfield area. State Route 33 leads north from Santa Nella  to Gustine and southeast  to Los Banos. 

The San Joaquin Valley National Cemetery, including the California Korean War Veterans Memorial, is located to the west of Santa Nella, on McCabe Road.  Nearby attractions also include the San Luis Reservoir and Forebay Golf Course.

Transportation
Interstate 5 intersects with State Route 33 in Santa Nella. State Route 152, a major east–west highway connecting nearby Los Banos with the Santa Clara Valley, runs south of town.

Gustine is served by public Dial-A-Ride from Merced County's The Bus. The service connects Santa Nella with Gustine, Los Banos, Dos Palos, and other communities on the west side of Merced County.

Economy

Santa Nella is a major stopping point along the Interstate 5 corridor for those traveling between Los Angeles and either the San Francisco Bay Area or Sacramento, with various fast food outlets, motels, and gas stations. These services include Hotel Mission de Oro's, The Kitchen at the Mission, Pea Soup Andersen's restaurant, In-N-Out Burger and the Santa Nella Food Center.

Demographics
The 2010 United States Census reported that Santa Nella had a population of 1,380. The racial makeup of Santa Nella was 832 (60.3%) White, 22 (1.6%) African American, 25 (1.8%) Native American, 31 (2.2%) Asian, 0 (0.0%) Pacific Islander, 433 (31.4%) from other races, and 37 (2.7%) from two or more races. Hispanic or Latino of any race were 968 persons (70.1%).

The Census reported that 1,380 people (100% of the population) lived in households, 0 (0%) lived in non-institutionalized group quarters, and 0 (0%) were institutionalized.

There were 409 households, out of which 209 (51.1%) had children under the age of 18 living in them, 233 (57.0%) were opposite-sex married couples living together, 52 (12.7%) had a female householder with no husband present, 34 (8.3%) had a male householder with no wife present.  There were 20 (4.9%) unmarried opposite-sex partnerships, and 3 (0.7%) same-sex married couples or partnerships. 70 households (17.1%) were made up of individuals, and 17 (4.2%) had someone living alone who was 65 years of age or older. The average household size was 3.37.  There were 319 families (78.0% of all households); the average family size was 3.84.

The population was spread out, with 468 people (33.9%) under the age of 18, 136 people (9.9%) aged 18 to 24, 380 people (27.5%) aged 25 to 44, 303 people (22.0%) aged 45 to 64, and 93 people (6.7%) who were 65 years of age or older.  The median age was 30.4 years. For every 100 females, there were 120.1 males.  For every 100 females age 18 and over, there were 109.7 males.

The homeowner vacancy rate was 14.4%; the rental vacancy rate was 8.0%.  686 people (49.7% of the population) lived in owner-occupied housing units and 694 people (50.3%) lived in rental housing units.

Government

See also

 List of places in California

References

External links

 Santa Nella Chamber of Commerce
 Information on Rancho Centinella by the historian Frank Forrest Latta

Census-designated places in Merced County, California